Huang Xin is a Chinese artist and photographer based in Shandong. He recently came to attention following his participation in Paris exhibition Vide et Plein.

Biography
Huang was born in Shandong, China.
French art critic Gérard Xuriguera said of his work : "Rothko and Malevitch seem at times to reappear here, but they are but a jumping-off point for a philosophy simultaneously rational and wandering."
His friend Liu Bolin said of his work : "At the same time that he says nothing, he says everything," referencing Taoist philosophy. - Liu Bolin

Solo exhibitions
 “川贵行” Shandong Centre Of Art & Design

Group exhibitions
 Vide et Plein (exhibition showing works of 10 Asian artists organized by Paris-based association Maison Bleu Studio)

References

Artists from Shandong
Chinese photographers
Living people
Year of birth missing (living people)